Udo Mainzer (born 3 July 1945) is a German art historian and monument conservator.

Career 
Born in Witterda, Thuringia, Mainzer studied history, art history and archaeology at the University of Cologne from 1968 and obtained his doctorate there in 1973 under Günther Binding with a dissertation on Stadttore im Rheinland. Since 1976, he has been a lecturer in art history and monument preservation at the Faculty of Philosophy there and was appointed honorary professor in 1983.

In 1979 he was appointed to the LVR Office for the Preservation of Monuments in the Rhineland, based first in Bonn and from 1985 at Brauweiler Abbey in Brauweiler. In his last years of service (at least since 2008), he was the longest-serving state conservator in Germany.

Honours and honorary posts 
In 1998, Mainzer received the Medal of Honour of the Cologne University of Applied Sciences and in 2004 the Cross of Merit of the Verdienstorden der Republik Polen.

Publications 
 Stadttore im Rheinland. Abt. Architektur des Kunsthistor. Instituts der Universität Köln. Diss. 1973.
 Stadttore im Rheinland. Rheinischer Verein f. Denkmalpflege u. Landschaftsschutz, 1976. 
 (ed.): Gartenkultur im Rheinland: Vom Mittelalter bis zur Moderne. Imhof Verlag, Petersberg, 2003. 
 with Günther Binding and Anita Wiedenau: Kleine Kunstgeschichte des deutschen Fachwerkbaus. 4th edition. Wissenschaftliche Buchgesellschaft, 1989, 
 (ed.): Was ist ein Baudenkmal? Eine Beispielsammlung zur Begriffsbestimmung. Rheinland Verlag GmbH, Köln 1983
 (ed.): Denkmalpflege in der Praxis. Rheinland-Verlag, Bonn. 
 (ed.): Paul Clemen: Zur 125. Wiederkehr seines Geburtstages. Köln 1991.
 (ed.) with Petra Leser): Architektur-Geschichten: Festschrift für Günther Binding zum 60. Geburtstag.  J.P. Bachem Verlag, 1996. 
 Dehio, Georg: Handbuch der deutschen Kunstdenkmäler. NRW I; Rheinland. Bearb. Claudia Euskirchen among others Mit einer Einführung von Udo Mainzer. Deutscher Kunst-Verlag, Munich, 2005. 
 Kleine illustrierte Kunstgeschichte der Stadt Köln. Bachem, Cologne 2015, .
 Kleine illustrierte Architekturgeschichte der Stadt Köln. J. P. Bachem, Cologne 2017, .

References

Further reading 
 sorted alphabetically by authors / editors 
 Claudia Euskirchen, Marco Kieser, Angela Pfotenhauer; Sigurd Greven-Stiftung, Köln (Hrsg.): Hörsaal, Amt und Marktplatz. Festschrift für Udo Mainzer zum 60. Geburtstag. Forschung und Denkmalpflege im Rheinland. Schnell & Steiner, 2005, .
 darin: Norbert Nußbaum: Zu den Schriften von Udo Mainzer, .
 Udo Mainzer: Udo Mainzer. Landeskonservator für das Rheinland 1979–2011. Wernersche Verlagsgesellschaft, Worms 2011, 
 Ulrich Stevens (Red.): Denkmal-Kultur im Rheinland. Festschrift für Udo Mainzer zum 65. Geburtstag (= Arbeitshefte der Rheinischen Denkmalpflege 75). Wernersche Verlagsgesellschaft, Worms 2010,

External links 
 
 Speech (in German)

Historical preservationists
German art historians
Academic staff of the University of Cologne
Officers of the Order of Merit of the Republic of Poland
1945 births
Living people
People from Thuringia